The 11th Academy Awards were held on February 23, 1939, at the Biltmore Hotel in Los Angeles, California.  It was the first Academy Awards show without an official host.

Frank Capra became the first person to win three Best Director awards, to be followed by John Ford (who would go on to win four) and William Wyler. La Grande Illusion was the first non-English language film to be nominated for Best Picture.

This was the first of only two times in Oscar history in which three of the four acting winners had won before; only Fay Bainter was a first-time award winner. The only other time that this happened was at the 67th Academy Awards in 1994. Fay Bainter was the first performer in the Oscars history to receive two acting nominations in the same year, while Spencer Tracy became the first of two actors to win Best Actor two years in a row; the other, Tom Hanks, also did so in 1994. 

George Bernard Shaw's screenplay win for Pygmalion made him the first—and, for over 60 years, only—person to win both a Nobel Prize and an Academy Award until Bob Dylan received Nobel Prize in Literature in 2016 after having won the Academy Award for Best Original Song in 2001.

Radio coverage was banned at the ceremony. A reporter, George Fischer from Los Angeles' Mutual Radio Network station, KHJ, which had been reporting from the Academy Awards since 1930, locked himself in a booth and was able to broadcast for about 12 minutes before security guards broke down the door. Partial radio coverage was permitted again beginning with the 1942 ceremony.

Winners and nominees 

Nominees were announced on February 5, 1939. Winners are listed first and highlighted in boldface.

Academy Honorary Awards 

 J. Arthur Ball "for his outstanding contributions to the advancement of color in Motion Picture Photography". (Scroll)
 Walt Disney "for creating Snow White and the Seven Dwarfs [1937], recognized as a significant screen innovation which has charmed millions and pioneered a great new entertainment field for the motion picture cartoon". (One statuette and seven miniature statuettes, representing the Seven Dwarfs, on a stepped base.) This is a rare case of a film being recognized in two succeeding ceremonies, as the film was also nominated for Best Score the previous year at the 10th Academy Awards.
 Gordon Jennings, Jan Domela, Dev Jennings, Irmin Roberts, Art Smith, Farciot Edouart, Loyal Griggs, Loren L. Ryder, Harry D. Mills, Louis H. Mesenkop, and Walter Oberst "for outstanding achievement in creating Special Photographic and Sound Effects in the Paramount production, Spawn of the North". (Plaque)
 Oliver Marsh and Allen Davey "for the color cinematography of the Metro-Goldwyn-Mayer production, Sweethearts". (Plaque)
 Harry M. Warner "in recognition of patriotic service in the production of historical short subjects presenting significant episodes in the early struggle of the American people for liberty". (Scroll)

Irving G. Thalberg Memorial Award 

 Hal B. Wallis

Academy Juvenile Awards 

Academy Juvenile Awards were presented to:

 Deanna Durbin and Mickey Rooney  "for their significant contribution in bringing to the screen the spirit and personification of youth, and as juvenile players setting a high standard of ability and achievement". (Shared; miniature statuette)

Multiple nominations and awards 

The following twenty-six films received multiple nominations:

 7 nominations: You Can't Take It with You
 6 nominations: Alexander's Ragtime Band
 5 nominations: Boys Town, Four Daughters, Jezebel and Merrily We Live
 4 nominations: The Adventures of Robin Hood, Algiers, The Citadel, If I Were King, Mad About Music, Marie Antoinette and Pygmalion
 3 nominations: Angels with Dirty Faces, Army Girl, Carefree, The Cowboy and the Lady, The Great Waltz, Suez, Test Pilot and The Young in Heart
 2 nominations: Blockade, The Goldwyn Follies, Sweethearts, That Certain Age and Vivacious Lady

The following four films received multiple awards:

 3 awards: The Adventures of Robin Hood
 2 awards: Boys Town, Jezebel and You Can't Take It with You

In memoriam

See also 

 1938 in film

References

External links 
 Official Website of the Academy of Motion Picture Arts and Sciences

Academy Awards ceremonies
1938 film awards
1939 in Los Angeles
1938 in American cinema
February 1939 events